The Civic Warriors of Maruleng (CWM) is a political party based in Limpopo, South Africa.

The party won three seats in Maruleng Local Municipality in the 2016 municipal local elections, running on a platform of rural development and combating crime and corruption.

The party has highlighted numerous acts of corruption in Maruleng. In January 2018, the Civic Warriors of Maruleng highlighted a case where the municipality was renting a single waste removal truck for R500 000 a month.

It is contesting the 2019 general election in Limpopo province only.

Murder of Mapampole Hendrick Shai 
Party president Mapampole Hendrick Shai was murdered outside Naphuno Magistrate’s Court in February 2017. He was to appear in court charged with taxi violence at the time, and it is believed the attack was an act of vengeance. Shai's cousin, Jeffrey Morema, stated that Shai was a committed community activist, and believed the murder was carried out by those "petrified of his new political party".

Election results

Provincial elections

! rowspan=2 | Election
! colspan=2 | Eastern Cape
! colspan=2 | Free State
! colspan=2 | Gauteng
! colspan=2 | Kwazulu-Natal
! colspan=2 | Limpopo
! colspan=2 | Mpumalanga
! colspan=2 | North-West
! colspan=2 | Northern Cape
! colspan=2 | Western Cape
|-
! % !! Seats
! % !! Seats
! % !! Seats
! % !! Seats
! % !! Seats
! % !! Seats
! % !! Seats
! % !! Seats
! % !! Seats
|-
! 2019
| - || -
| - || -
| - || -
| - || -
| 0.14% || 0/49
| - || -
| - || -
| - || -
| - || -
|}

Municipal elections

|-
! Election
! Votes
! %
|-
! 2016
| 8,536
| 0.02%
|-
|}

References

Political parties in South Africa